Ibn Fuladh, also known as Ibn Puladh, was a Daylamite military officer who is known for revolting against his Buyid overlords. He was the son of Fuladh ibn Manadhar, a prominent Buyid officer who was son of Manadhar, an Justanid king.

Ibn Fuladh, in order to gain Qazvin as his fief, revolted against the Buyid ruler Majd al-Dawla in 1016. Majd al-Dawla, however, refused to make him governor of Qazvin, which made Ibn Fuladh threaten him around the countryside of his capital in Ray. Majd al-Dawla then requested the aid of his vassal, the Bavandid ruler Abu Ja'far Muhammad, who managed to defeat Ibn Fuladh and repel him from Ray. Ibn Fuladh then requested aid from the Ziyarid ruler Manuchihr, who was a rival of the Buyids. Ibn Fuladh agreed to become Manuchihr's vassal in return for his aid. The following year, a combined army of Ibn Fuladh and Manuchihr besieged Ray, which forced Majd al-Dawla to make Fuladh the governor of Isfahan. However, the Kakuyid ruler Muhammad ibn Rustam Dushmanziyar, who was the original ruler of Isfahan, defeated Ibn Fuladh, and possibly killing him during the battle.

References

Sources 
 
 

Daylamites
Buyid generals
11th-century deaths
11th-century Iranian people
Justanids
Iranian rebels
Buyid governors
History of Isfahan Province
Year of birth unknown
Rebels against the Buyid dynasty